Lee Yong-rae  (Hangul: 이용래; Hanja: 李容來; born 17 April 1986) is a South Korean football player who plays as a midfielder for Daegu FC. Although he mainly plays as defensive midfield for both club and the national team, his tactical awareness allows him to operate as a box-to-box midfielder, side midfielder, and full-back in emergencies.

Club career statistics

Honours 
 Hyundai Oilbank K-League Challenge Best 11 Midfield Division : 2014
 Winning the 37th National High School Football Championship : 2004

Chiangrai United
 Thai League 1 (1): 2019
 Thai FA Cup (1): 2018
 Thai League Cup (1): 2018
 Thailand Champions Cup (2): 2018, 2020

References

 https://uk.soccerway.com/players/yong-rae-lee/76503/

External links
 
 
 

1986 births
Living people
Association football midfielders
South Korean footballers
South Korea international footballers
Gyeongnam FC players
Suwon Samsung Bluewings players
Ansan Mugunghwa FC players
K League 1 players
K League 2 players
2011 AFC Asian Cup players
Korea University alumni
Sportspeople from Daejeon